The Savannah metropolitan area is centered on the principal city of Savannah, Georgia. The official name given by the U.S. Office of Management and Budget (OMB) is the Savannah, GA Metropolitan Statistical Area, which is used for statistical purposes by the United States Census Bureau and other entities. The OMB defines this area as consisting of Bryan, Chatham, and Effingham counties in Georgia; its total population was 404,798 in the official 2020 U.S. Census, compared to 347,611 in the 2010 census (an increase of 16.45%). Savannah is the third most populous of fourteen Georgia metropolitan areas (ranked after Atlanta and Augusta). It was the fastest-growing metro area in the state for the period 2010–2020 (followed by Atlanta, Gainesville, and Warner Robins).

Metro (MSA) Counties

Metro (MSA) Communities
(Note: "census-designated places" are unincorporated)

Places with more than 140,000 inhabitants
Savannah (principal city)

Places with 25,000 to 50,000 inhabitants
Pooler

Places with 10,000 to 25,000 inhabitants
Garden City
Georgetown (census-designated place)
Port Wentworth
Richmond Hill
Rincon
Wilmington Island (census-designated place)

Places with 5,000 to 10,000 inhabitants
Skidaway Island (census-designated place)
Whitemarsh Island (census-designated place)

Places with 1,000 to 5,000 inhabitants
Bloomingdale
Guyton
Henderson
Isle of Hope (census-designated place)
Montgomery (census-designated place)
Pembroke
Springfield
Thunderbolt
Tybee Island

Places with fewer than 1,000 inhabitants

Vernonburg

Unincorporated places with fewer than 1,000 inhabitants
Keller
Pin Point

Metro (MSA) Demographics

As of the census of 2000, there were 293,000 people, 111,105 households, and 76,405 families residing within the MSA. The racial makeup of the MSA was 61.24% White, 34.87% African American, 0.26% Native American, 1.49% Asian, 0.06% Pacific Islander, 0.82% from other races, and 1.26% from two or more races. Hispanic or Latino of any race were 2.18% of the population.

The median income for a household in the MSA was $44,201, and the median income for a family was $50,052. Males had a median income of $37,992 versus $24,777 for females. The per capita income for the MSA was $19,940.

Combined Statistical Area (CSA) 

The Savannah–Hinesville–Statesboro–Jesup Combined Statistical Area (CSA) is made up of seven counties in Georgia. The official 2020 U.S. Census population for this area was 597,465.

CSA Components

Two Metropolitan Statistical Areas (MSAs) and two Micropolitan Statistical Areas (μSAs) form this Combined Statistical Area.

See also
Georgia census statistical areas

References

 
Geography of Chatham County, Georgia
Geography of Effingham County, Georgia
Geography of Bryan County, Georgia
Metropolitan areas of Georgia (U.S. state)
Regions of Georgia (U.S. state)